A Spartiate (cf. its plural Spartiatae 'Spartans') [ˌspärshēˈātē(z)] or Spartiate [ˈspärshēˌāt] (from respectively the Latin and French forms corresponding to Classical- and pl. Σπᾰρτῐᾱ́ται) or Homoios (pl. Homoioi from respectively Classical- and Ὅμοιοι "those who are alike") was an elite full-citizen male of Sparta.  

Full citizen Spartiates were barred by law from work, and were supported by the other social classes of Spartan society. From a young age, male Spartiates were trained for battle and put through grueling challenges intended to craft them into fearless warriors. In battle, they had the reputation of being the best soldiers in Greece, and the strength of Sparta's hoplite forces let the city become the dominant state in Greece throughout much of the Classical period. Other city-states were reluctant to  attack Sparta, even though it could muster a force of only about 8000 Spartiates during the zenith of its dominance.  Such was the reputation of its soldiers.

Structure of Spartan society

Classical Spartan society was rigidly divided into several castes, each with assigned duties and privileges. The smallest of them, with the most power and freedom, was the Spartiate elite. Spartiates were exempt from manual labour and controlled the government of the state. Spartiates men were expected to prepare constantly for military conflict. Below the Spartiates were the perioeci, literally "dwellers around", inhabitants of outlying towns who carried out most of the trade and commerce of the city since Spartiates were forbidden from engaging in commercial activity. The lowest were the helots, enslaved populations tied to the land and over whom the Spartan state claimed ownership. In the late 5th century BC and later, a new class, the neodamodeis, literally new damos dwellers, arose and seems to have been composed of liberated helots. Also were the hypomeiones, literally inferiors, men who were probably although not certainly Spartiates who had lost their social rank.

Origins

According to classical accounts, the Spartan Constitution was the product of a great lawgiver, Lycurgus. He was said to have written the Spartan constitution early in the Archaic period, most likely in the 770s BC.

It is impossible to determine whether Lycurgus was an actual historical figure. It is clear, however, that at some point in the late Archaic period, the model of Spartan society was changed from a monarchical system to an aristocracy for the elite warrior class. That change is likely to have been in some way related to the change from Dark Age warfare, in which nobles were the dominant force, to the hoplite warfare of the classical period. Around the time of that change, Sparta embarked on the conquest of the neighboring state of Messenia. The acquisition of such a comparatively large piece of territory and conquered population seems to have both provided the basis for the system of helotage and required the existence of a large military force to keep the potentially-rebellious Messenians under control. The Spartiates thus became a permanently-armed master class, living off the labour of the helots and preventing rebellion through constant struggle.

Spartiate lifestyle

During the 6th and the 5th centuries BC, the Spartan system was at its height. In 555 BC, Sparta defeated Tegea and forced that state to become its ally. Around 544 BC, Sparta defeated Argos and established itself as the pre-eminent power in the Peloponnese. For over 150 years, Sparta became the dominant land power of Greece, with the Spartiates hoplites serving as the core of its army.

To maintain the social system of the city, it was necessary to have a force ready to oppose any uprising of the helots (that occurred several times in the classical period). To ensure their military readiness, Spartiate youths enrolled in military training (agoge) from the age of seven to thirty, the age of full citizenship. From that age until they became too old to fight, they would live in their barracks, visiting their families (and, later, their wives) only when they could sneak out. Spartiate women, as well, were expected to remain athletically fit since the Spartans believed that strong and healthy parents would produce strong and healthy children.

Spartiates were expected to adhere to an ideal of military valour, as exemplified by the poems of Tyrtaeus, who praised men who fell in battle and heaped scorn on those who fled.

Each Spartiate male was assigned a plot of land, with the helots that worked it. That was the source of his income since he performed no labour or commerce himself. The primary use of that income was to pay the dues of the communal mess halls to which all Spartiates were required to belong. Any Spartiate who was unable to pay these dues was demoted from his class.  

Politically, Spartiate males composed the army assembly, the body that elected the ephors, the most powerful magistrates of Sparta after the kings.  The Spartiates were also the source of the krypteia, a sort of secret police, which, by measures such as assassination and kidnapping, sought to prevent rebellion among the helots.

Decline of Spartiates

In the late 5th and the early 4th centuries BC, the Spartiate class gradually shrank in number, along with Spartan military prowess, for several reasons. First was attrition through the increasingly-frequent wars that Sparta found itself embroiled in from the mid-5th century onward. Since Spartiates were required to marry late, birth rates were low, and it was difficult to replace losses from the class.  Exacerbating that problem was the possibility of demotion from Spartiate status for a number of reasons, such as cowardice in battle and inability to pay for membership in the syssitia. The latter became increasingly severe; as commercial activity began to develop in Sparta, some Spartiates would sell the land from which they were supposed to draw their earnings. Since the constitution included no known provisions for promotion to Spartiate status, the number of Spartiates gradually dwindled.

By the mid-4th century BC, the number of Spartiates had been critically reduced although Sparta continued to hold sway over much of Greece. Finally, at Leuctra in 371 BC, a Theban army decisively defeated a Spartan force, killing 400 Spartiates of a force of 700 and breaking the back of Spartan military power. In 370 BC, Messenia was liberated by a Theban army, liberating the helots and destroying the basis of the Spartan social system. The Spartan state never recovered its former power, and the Spartan army, by the later 3rd century, was not particularly superior to other armies in Greece.

See also
HMS Spartiate
Stratocracy

References

Literature
Xenophon. Constitution of the Spartans.

Ancient Greece
Citizenship
Social classes of Sparta
Men's social titles
Warriors of Europe

pl:Spartiaci